The 2018–19 Kent Senior Cup was an English football competition played between senior clubs in the county of Kent. It was administered by the Kent County Football Association.

First round
16 teams entered at the first round with a further 8 receiving byes directly into the second round.

Second round

Quarter-finals

Semi-finals

Final

References
 Kent Senior Cup 2018/19 - North Kent Non League
 Kent Senior Cup - Kent FA

Cup
County Cup competitions